Shingo Kunieda and Maikel Scheffers defeated Robin Ammerlaan and Ronald Vink in the final, 6–2, 7–5 to win the men's doubles wheelchair tennis title at the 2008 French Open. With the win, Kunieda completed the career Grand Slam.

Stéphane Houdet and Michaël Jérémiasz were the defending champions, but Jérémiasz did not participate. Houdet partnered Nicolas Peifer, but was defeated by Ammerlaan and Vink in the semifinals.

Seeds
 Robin Ammerlaan /  Ronald Vink (final)
 Shingo Kunieda /  Maikel Scheffers (champions)

Draw

Finals

External links
Draw

Wheelchair Men's Doubles
Wheelchair tennis tournaments